The Lion Hunt may refer to:

Løvejagten, a 1907 silent film by Danish producer Ole Olsen and director Viggo Larsen
The Lion Hunt (Delacroix), a series of oil on canvas paintings produced by the French artist Eugène Delacroix in the mid-1850s
The Lion and Leopard Hunt, a Rubens painting often simply called The Lion Hunt
The Lion Hunt (Rubens), a 1621 painting by Peter Paul Rubens
The Lion Hunters, a 1951 American film. It was the fifth in the 12-film Bomba, the Jungle Boy series
The lion hunts of Amenhotep III during the first ten years of his reign, one of a group of five historical and commemorative scarabs made during the reign of Amenhotep III
Lion Hunt of Ashurbanipal, appears on a famous group of Assyrian palace reliefs from the North Palace of Nineveh that are now displayed in room 10a of the British Museum

See also 
Lion hunting